Black Face is the south wall of an east–west ridge in Arena Valley,  south of East Beacon, in the Quartermain Mountains, Victoria Land. It was named by the New Zealand Antarctic Place-Names Committee from the color of the rock following geological work in the area by C.T. McElroy, G. Rose, and K.J. Whitby in 1980–81.

References 

Ridges of Victoria Land
Scott Coast